Ås is the administrative center of the municipality of Tydal in Trøndelag county, Norway. Most of the residents of Tydal municipality live in or around the village of Ås.

The village has some small industries, especially wood products. There are also some sporting facilities in Ås.

References

Villages in Trøndelag
Tydal